Tsenacommacah (pronounced  in English; "densely inhabited land"; also written Tscenocomoco, Tsenacomoco, Tenakomakah, Attanoughkomouck, and Attan-Akamik) is the name given by the Powhatan people to their native homeland, the area encompassing all of Tidewater Virginia and parts of the Eastern Shore.

The term Tsenacommacah comes from the Powhatan language, and means “densely inhabited land.”

History

Origins and contact
The Powhatan were part of a powerful Chiefdom of Virginia Indian tribes, also known as the Powhatan Confederacy, that spoke an Algonquian language.

The chief of the Powhatan people in the late 16th and early 17th centuries, Wahunsenacawh, had originally controlled only six tribes, but throughout the late 1500s he added more tribes to his nation, through diplomacy and/or force. He added the Kecoughtan by 1598. 

By 1607, Wahunsenacawh controlled more than thirty tribes. The original six tribes under Wahunsenacawh were: the Powhatan (proper), the Arrohateck, the Appamattuck, the Pamunkey, the Mattaponi, and the Chiskiack. Some other affiliated groups included the Rappahannocks, Weyanoak, Paspahegh,  Warraskoyack, and Nansemond. Another closely related tribe of the same language group was the Chickahominy, but they managed to preserve their autonomy from the Powhatan Paramount Chiefdom.

The Accawmacke, located on the Eastern Shore across the Chesapeake Bay, were paid nominal tribute to the Powhatan Chiefdom, but enjoyed autonomy under their own Paramount Chief or "Emperor", Debedeavon (aka "The Laughing King").

Warfare
By early 1609, relations had begun to sour between the Powhatan and English colonists. As a result Wahunsenacawh moved his primary residence from Werowocomoco, off the York River, to Orapax (or Orapakes), located in a swamp at the head of the Chickahominy River.

By 1614, Wahunsenacawh had again moved his primary residence, this time further northwest to a location on the north bank of the Pamunkey River known as Matchut, which was not far from where Wahunsenacawh's brother Opechancanough ruled at Youghtanund.

Wahunsenacawh died in 1618, after which the chiefdom was ultimately passed to his younger brother Opechancanough, who led the Indian Massacre of 1622 as well as a second attack in 1644. Both attacks provoked retaliations from English colonists.

A peace treaty, signed in 1646, brought an end to the conflicts between the Powhatan and the English. The treaty was signed by Opechancanough's successor Necotowance – Opechancanough himself was captured by English colonists and killed by a settler assigned to guard him in 1646.

As part of the treaty of 1646, the size of Tsenacommacah was reduced. The boundaries specified in the treaty separated Virginia Indian lands from those that were considered colonial territory, and restricted crossings to those on official business. Badges were required for all visitors. The treaty also established the payment of a yearly tribute to the English, as well as delineating a number of tribal land reservations.

Among the surviving tribes of the now-dissolved Confederacy, the Appomattocs, Nansemonds and Weyanokes retreated to the south, becoming independent of Necotowance, as did the Powhites or Powhatan proper. The Pamunkey, Mattaponi, Chickahominy, Rappahannock, Kiskiack, Wiccocomico, Patawomeck, Morattico, Nanzatico, Sekakawon, and Onawmanient, occupying the peninsulas north of the York, were cut off from the southern tribes by the English colonial authorities.

The Virginia Colony long respected its southern boundary established by this treaty, refusing to recognize settlements beyond it as late as 1705. However, the ban on settling north of the York river was lifted September 1, 1649, and a wave of new immigrants quickly flooded the northern tribes, leaving them scattered and isolated on ever-shrinking patches of land. That year, the Pamunkey weroance, Totopotomoi, received  for his tribe along both sides of the upper Pamunkey River, and the Kiskiack weroance, Ossakican was reserved  on the Piankatank.

In 1650, another treaty reserved land for the creation of Indian towns, where  of land was granted per warrior. These lands became smaller and smaller in following years. Tracts were surveyed for the remaining tribes in the following decades, but these quickly shrank as they were either sold off or in some cases actually seized outright.

Following Bacon's Rebellion, the Treaty of Middle Plantation was signed by many Virginia Indian leaders in 1677, limiting Tsenocommacah even further. The treaty set up six reservations, reinforced the annual tribute payment to the English, and more fully acknowledged the Virginia tribes' subjection to the King of England.

Contemporary tribes
All of the reservations, save two, were lost over the next two centuries.  Even so, many of the remaining tribes still live in or near their ancestral lands.  The Pamunkey and Mattaponi are the only tribes that still maintain their reservations from the 17th century.  As such, these two tribes still make their yearly tribute payments, of fish and game, as stipulated by the 1646 and 1677 treaties.  As far as anyone knows, the tribes have not missed a "payment" in 331 years.  Every year, on the Wednesday before Thanksgiving, they go to the Virginia Governor's house in Richmond to make their yearly payment.  A ceremony is held in which a deer, turkey, or fish and some pottery are presented to the governor.  Before the ceremony a brunch is held where the tribes are able to converse with the governor. It has not always been easy for the Mattaponi and the Pamunkey to get the necessary items for their yearly payment, but they have made it a point of honor to uphold their end of the bargain.

Society

Population

The population of Tsenacommacah was 14,000 to 21,000 people by 1607. The tribes shared mutually intelligible dialects of the Powhatan Language. The language, however, died out by the 1790s after the people switched to English. Much of the language has been forgotten, and is only known from two wordlists made by William Strachey and Captain John Smith. However, there have been attempts to reconstruct the language, particularly from linguists like Frank T. Siebert and Blair A. Rudes.

Lifestyle

The Powhatan lived in Tidewater Virginia. Their homes were called yehakins, and they were made by bending saplings and placing woven mats or bark over top of the saplings.  All of Virginia's natives practiced slash-and-burn agriculture, and cultivated maize. A village became unusable as soil productivity gradually declined and local fish and game were depleted, so they periodically moved their villages from site to site. Villagers cleared the fields by felling, girdling, or firing trees at the base and then using fire to reduce the slash and stumps. The natives also used fire to maintain extensive areas of open game habitat throughout the East, later called "barrens" by European colonists. The Powhatan also had rich fishing grounds. Bison had migrated to this area by the early 15th century.

The Powhatan primarily used fires to heat their sleeping rooms. As a result, less bedding was needed, and bedding materials could be easily stored during daytime hours. Couples typically slept head to foot.

Powhatan men were warriors and hunters, and would run and walk extensively through the woods in pursuit of enemies or game, while women were gardeners and gatherers and would spend hours tending crops, pounding corn into meal, gathering nuts, and performing other chores. The women would construct hunting camps when the men were gone for extended periods of time. Women were also believed to serve as barbers, decorate homes, and produce decorative clothing. The Powhatan domestic economy depended on the labor of both sexes.

Religion

The native Powhatan religion has been well documented. The Powhatans believed in two primary Gods. Ahone was the creator of life. Oke was the lesser twin god who accepted sacrifices and was prayed to for help. Beneath these two were many other spirits. The Powhatan tried to appease Oke with various offerings such as jewelry and tobacco. Religious leaders were advisors to tribal leaders. It is believed that Powhatans would make offerings and pray to the sun during sunrises.

Government

Capitals

Tsenacommacah originally had two capitals. The main capital was the village of Werowocomoco, located in present-day Gloucester County. The second capital, the village of Powhatan was believed to be in the present-day Powhatan Hill section of the eastern part of Richmond, Virginia, or perhaps nearby in a location which became part of Tree Hill Farm.

In 2003 archaeologists initiated excavations at a site in Gloucester County that have revealed an extensive indigenous settlement from about 1200 (the late Woodland period) through the early Contact period. Work since then has added to their belief that this is the location of Werowocomoco. The more than  residential settlement extends up to  back from the river. In addition to extensive artifacts from hundreds of years of indigenous settlement, researchers have found a variety of trade goods related to the brief interaction of Native Americans and English in the early years of Jamestown.

Around 1609, Wahunsenacawh shifted his capital from Werowocomoco to Orapakes, located in a swamp at the head of the Chickahominy River, near the modern-day interchange of Interstate 64 and Interstate 295. Sometime between 1611 and 1614, he moved further north to Matchut, in present-day King William County on the north bank of the Pamunkey River.

Leadership

Each tribe had its own name and chief (werowance/weroance or weroansqua if female), and Tsenacommacah as a whole was ruled by a paramount chief (mamanatowick) named Wahunsenacawh, or more popularly Chief Powhatan.

The Mamanatowick let their district and subordinate weroances make the final decision on how to handle hostile situations. This was made apparent with the events that took place in 1607 and the hostility with the newcomers (English colonists). Weroances and Priest were the only ones allowed to enter into religious temples. A weroance did not go to meet any visitor, visitors were escorted to see a weroance. The weroance, their wives, and councilors often dressed in the finest jewels, and tanned deer skin.

Several of the weroances' personal names were known and some recorded by William Strachey and other sources. The names of their respective chieftaincies were also commonly used as titles, exactly analogous to European peerages, so that the Weroance of Arrohattec (whose given name was Ashaquid) was often referred to simply as "Arrohattec", much as the Earl of Essex would be referred to just as "Essex" in lieu of a personal name.

When the first English colonists arrived in Virginia, some of the weroances subject to the paramount chief Powhatan, or mamanatowick (Wahunsenacawh) were his own nearest male relatives:

 Parahunt, Weroance of the Powhatan (proper), also called Tanx ("little") Powhatan, said by Strachey to be a son of the paramount chief Powhatan, and often confused with same.
 Pochins, Weroance of the Kecoughtan, was also a son of the paramount chief, whom he had appointed there some time after slaying their previous ruler in ca. 1598.  
Opechancanough, Chief Powhatan's younger brother, was a weroance of the Pamunkey, but increased in power, and came to be the effective ruler of the entire Powhatan Confederacy after Wahunsenacawh's death in 1618.

In Tsenacommacah, women could inherit power, because the inheritance of power was matrilineal. In A Map of Virginia John Smith of Jamestown explains:His [Chief Powhatan's] kingdome descendeth not to his sonnes nor children: but first to his brethren, whereof he hath 3 namely Opitchapan, Opechancanough, and Catataugh; and after their decease to his sisters. First to the eldest sister, then to the rest: and after them to the heires male and female of the eldest sister; but never to the heires of the males.

References

External links
The Anglo-Powhatan Wars
Powhatan Renape Nation – Rankokus American Indian Reservation
Wiccocomico Family Tree DNA Project

Powhatan Confederacy
Pre-Columbian cultural areas
Former countries of the United States
Former territorial entities in North America
Former confederations
Former countries in North America
Former regions and territories of the United States
Cultural regions